The 2018 Seychelles First Division is the top level football competition in Seychelles. It started on 7 March and ended on 29 December 2018.

Standings
Final table.

  1.Côte d'Or (Praslin)                     22  15  5  2  60-22  50  Champions
  2.Red Star Defence Forces                 22  14  7  1  51-21  49
  3.Lightstars FC (Grande Anse)             22  15  3  4  41-21  48
  4.Saint Louis Suns United (Victoria)      22  11  7  4  44-23  40
  5.Saint Michel FC (Anse-aux-Pins)         22  12  3  7  53-27  39
  6.La Passe FC (La Passe)                  22  10  6  6  41-34  36
  7.Foresters (Mont Fleuri)                 22   7  7  8  28-27  28
  8.Anse Réunion FC (Anse Réunion)          22   7  2 13  32-41  23
  9.Revengers FC (Praslin)                  22   4  5 13  28-60  17
 10.Northern Dynamo (Glacis)                22   4  3 15  31-56  15
  - - - - - - - - - - - - - - - - - - - - - - - - - - - - - - - - -
 11.Au Cap                                  22   4  3 15  25-59  15  Relegation Playoff
 ------------------------------------------------------------------
 12.The Lions (Cascade)                     22   3  1 18  15-58  10  Relegated

References

Football leagues in Seychelles
First Division
Seychelles